Susan Shwartz (born December 31, 1949) is an American author.

Education and career 
She received her B.A. in English from Mount Holyoke College in 1972 and a PhD in English from Harvard University.

Shwartz's Heirs to Byzantium trilogy – Byzantium's Crown (1987), The Woman of Flowers (1987) and Queensblade (1988) is an alternate history series. The Heirs to Byzantium novels are set in a world where Marc Antony defeats Octavius in the Battle of Actium, and joins with Cleopatra to make Byzantium capital of the Roman Empire.

Shwartz's novel The Grail of Hearts (1992) is a fantasy that features the Holy Grail. It also features a sympathetic version of Kundry from Richard Wagner's opera Parsifal; Shwart's Kundry is depicted as a version of the Wandering Jew.

Shwartz has published several novels and sixty short stories.

Works

Novels

 The Woman of Flowers (1987)
 Byzantium's Crown (1987)
 Silk Roads and Shadows (1988)
 Queensblade (1988)
 Arabesques: More Tales of the Arabian Nights (1988)
 Heritage of Flight (1989)
 Imperial Lady (1989) with Andre Norton
 Arabesques II (1989)
 The Grail of Hearts (1991)
 Empire of the Eagle (1993) with Andre Norton. Historical novel about a group of Romans who flee the Battle of Carrhae and travel to India and China.   
 Shards of Empire (1996)
 Cross and Crescent (1997)
 Second Chances (2001)
 Hostile Takeover (2004)

She has also collaborated with science fiction writer (and fellow Mount Holyoke alumna) Judith Tarr on the following works:

S.M. Stirling – Blood Feuds (1993) (with Judith Tarr and Susan Shwartz and Harry Turtledove (Part of the "War World" sub-series in the "Co-dominium" series, originally created by Jerry Pournelle) and Blood Vengeance  (1994) (with Susan Shwartz and Judith Tarr and Harry Turtledove and Jerry Pournelle (Also part of the "War World" sub-series)
CoDominium – Blood Feuds (1992) Susan Shwartz, S.M. Stirling, Judith Tarr, and Harry Turtledove and Blood Vengeance (1994) Susan Shwartz, S.M. Stirling, Judith Tarr, and Harry Turtledove.

Star Trek novels
All co-written with Josepha Sherman

Vulcan's Forge (1997)
Vulcan's Heart (1999)
Exodus: Vulcan's Soul Book One (2004)
Exiles: Vulcan's Soul Trilogy Book Two (2006)
Epiphany: Vulcan's Soul Trilogy Book Three (2007)

Short-stories
 Suppose They Gave a Peace... (1992) (collected in Mike Resnick's alternate history anthology Alternate Presidents)
 And the Glory of Them (2002) (collected in Harry Turtledove's alternate history anthology Alternate Generals II)

Awards

Winner
1996 – San Francisco Chronicle Award for Best Novella
1995 (with Mike Resnick) – HOMer Award for Best Novella
1993 – San Francisco Chronicle Award for Best Novelette

Nominated
1995: Nebula Award for Best Novella
1993: Hugo Award for Best Novelette
1992, 1991, 1990: Nebula Award for Best Novelette
1989: Philip K. Dick Award
1987: Nebula Award for Best Short Story

See also
The Collected Short Fiction of C. J. Cherryh
The Enterprise Incident
Women science fiction authors

References

External links
Personal website
Bibliography at SciFan

Interview 1
Interview 2
Trek Nation

1949 births
Living people
American science fiction writers
American fantasy writers
American historical novelists
Mount Holyoke College alumni
Harvard University alumni
20th-century American novelists
21st-century American novelists
20th-century American women writers
21st-century American women writers
Women science fiction and fantasy writers
American women novelists
Writers of historical fiction set in antiquity